The New Adventures of Chor Lau-heung is a television series adapted from Gu Long's wuxia novels, primarily the Chu Liuxiang Series, but it also includes characters from the Little Li Flying Dagger series and Lu Xiaofeng Series. It was first broadcast on CTS and TVB in Taiwan and Hong Kong respectively in 2001.

Plot
Chu Liuxiang ("Chor Lau-heung" in Cantonese) is the famous "Bandit Chief" in the jianghu. His qinggong is unmatched and he leaves behind a trail of fragrance everywhere he goes. Once, Chu enters the palace to steal a treasure called the "Amber Guanyin", which contains a wooden figurine carved by "Little Li Flying Dagger" Li Xunhuan. In the palace, Chu meets Sikong Xing'er, the daughter of master thief Sikong Zhaixing, and her sworn sister Su Rongrong. While escaping from the guards' pursuit, Li Xunhuan dies trying to save Su Rongrong.

Chu Liuxiang and Su Rongrong later team up to investigate the theft of the "Heaven and Earth Holy Water" and they develop romantic feelings for each other after going through thick and thin together. They travel to the south later in search of an antidote and to find the truth about their family backgrounds. Chu discovers that he is actually a prince of a southern kingdom, and should rightfully become king. This sparks off a struggle in the royal family for succession to the throne. During that period of time, Chu Liuxiang starts another romantic relationship with Sikong Xing'er.

Faced with two different love interests, Chu Liuxiang has trouble choosing between Sikong Xing'er and Su Rongrong as his true love. On the other hand, he has to make a decision on whether to claim the throne or continue with his roaming life in the jianghu.

Cast
 Richie Ren as Chu Liuxiang
 Anita Yuen as Song Xihu
 Ruby Lin as Sikong Xing'er
 Ekin Cheng as Li Xunhuan
 Dicky Cheung as Monk Ruchen
 Gigi Lai as Su Rongrong
 Ng Man-tat as Sikong Zhaixing
 Daniel Chan as Emperor 
 Wayne Lai as Hu Tiehua
 Kelly Lin as Princess Mingzhu
 Jess Zhang as Li Hongxiu
 Mark Cheng as Xue Yiren
 Eric Suen as Luo Wuqing
 Kristy Yang as Xue Keren
 Monica Chan as Feng Nanyan
 Norman Chui as Xue Xiaoren
 Angie Cheung as Shi Fenghuang
 Yang Rui as Song Tian'er
 Joey Meng as Princess Yunluo
 Gabriel Harrison as Xie Changkong
 Ruco Chan as Wen Liangyu

External links
  The New Adventures of Chor Lau-heung official page on TVB's website
  The New Adventures of Chor Lau-heung official page on CTS's website

2001 Hong Kong television series debuts
2001 Hong Kong television series endings
Taiwanese wuxia television series
2001 Taiwanese television series debuts
2001 Taiwanese television series endings
Works based on Chu Liuxiang (novel series)
TVB dramas
Television shows based on works by Gu Long